Ghost, also known as Ghost B.C., is a Swedish rock band. They have released 5 albums and 3 extended plays (EPs), gathering 68 songs, mostly written by frontman Tobias Forge under the credit of "A Ghoul Writer".

This article gathers in the table below all the songs released by Ghost since their debut album Opus Eponymous (2010), in alphabetical order, and gives the song's writer(s), the first release album or EP, the album producer and the release year. It does not include live titles such as Ceremony and Devotion (2017).

Songs

Remixes/alternate versions

References

External links 
 
 Ghost song charting on Billboard

Ghost